The following television stations broadcast on digital channel 29 in the United States:

 K24II-D in Kanab, Utah, on virtual channel 7, which rebroadcasts KUED
 K29AZ-D in Newport, Oregon, on virtual channel 8, which rebroadcasts KGW
 K29BM-D in Montpelier, Idaho
 K29BN-D in Silver Springs, etc., Nevada
 K29CK-D in Carbondale, Colorado
 K29EB-D in Grand Rapids, Minnesota
 K29ED-D in Everett, Washington, on virtual channel 22, which rebroadcasts KZJO
 K29EG-D in Milton, etc., Oregon
 K29EL-D in La Grande, Oregon
 K29EM-D in Manti & Ephraim, Utah, on virtual channel 13, which rebroadcasts KSTU
 K29ES-D in Carson City, Nevada
 K29EV-D in Valmy, Nevada
 K29EY-D in Preston, Idaho, on virtual channel 2, which rebroadcasts KUTV
 K29FA-D in Beryl/Modena, etc., Utah
 K29FD-D in Lake Havasu City, Arizona
 K29FM-D in Artesia, New Mexico
 K29FR-D in Quanah, Texas
 K29FS-D in Wolf Point, Montana
 K29FY-D in Henefer/Echo, Utah
 K29GI-D in Holyoke, Colorado, on virtual channel 31, which rebroadcasts KDVR
 K29GJ-D in Tropic & Cannonville, Utah
 K29GK-D in Twentynine Palms, etc., California, on virtual channel 29
 K29GO-D in Cortez, etc., Colorado
 K29GV-D in Hagerman, Idaho
 K29HB-D in Clovis, New Mexico
 K29HD-D in Idalia, Colorado, on virtual channel 51, which rebroadcasts K16NJ-D
 K29HG-D in Jackson, Wyoming
 K29HL-D in Hanalei, etc., Hawaii
 K29HM-D in Lake George, Colorado
 K29HN-D in Escalante, Utah
 K29HR-D in Farmington, New Mexico
 K29HV-D in La Barge, etc., Wyoming
 K29HW-D in Austin, Texas
 K29HX-D in Wanship, Utah
 K29HY-D in Strong City, Oklahoma
 K29HZ-D in Woodward, etc., Oklahoma
 K29IA-D in Centralia, etc., Washington, on virtual channel 7, which rebroadcasts KIRO-TV
 K29IB-D in Grays River, etc., Washington, on virtual channel 6, which rebroadcasts KOIN
 K29ID-D in Weeksville, Montana
 K29IE-D in St. James, Minnesota
 K29IF-D in Frost, Minnesota
 K29IG-D in Sunlight Basin, Wyoming
 K29IH-D in Meeteetse, etc., Wyoming
 K29II-D in Park City, Utah, on virtual channel 14, which rebroadcasts KJZZ-TV
 K29IM-D in Samak, Utah, on virtual channel 11, which rebroadcasts KBYU-TV
 K29IN-D in Coalville and adjacent area, Utah
 K29IS-D in Round Mountain, Nevada
 K29IT-D in Gateview, Colorado, on virtual channel 8, which rebroadcasts KTSC
 K29IU-D in Parlin, Colorado, on virtual channel 2, which rebroadcasts K09TH-D
 K29IV-D in Fremont, Utah
 K29IW-D in Clear Creek, Utah
 K29IX-D in Caineville, Utah
 K29IY-D in Ferron, Utah
 K29IZ-D in Huntington, Utah
 K29JA-D in Alton, Utah
 K29JL-D in Las Animas, Colorado
 K29JN-D in Gold Beach, Oregon
 K29JO-D in Douglas, Wyoming
 K29JQ-D in Fishlake Resort, Utah
 K29JT-D in Butte, Montana
 K29JU-D in Garden City, Kansas
 K29KD-D in Delta, Utah
 K29KE-D in Big Falls, Minnesota
 K29KG-D in Idaho Falls, Idaho
 K29KJ-D in Orovada, Nevada
 K29KR-D in Camas Valley, Oregon
 K29KT-D in Thoreau, New Mexico
 K29KU-D in Bend, Oregon
 K29KY-D in Blackfoot, Idaho
 K29LB-D in Vernal, etc., Utah, on virtual channel 2, which rebroadcasts KUTV
 K29LC-D in Truth Or Consequences, New Mexico
 K29LG-D in Soda Springs, Idaho
 K29LJ-D in Altus, Oklahoma
 K29LL-D in Phoenix/Talent, Oregon
 K29LM-D in Cottonwood, etc., Arizona, on virtual channel 5, which rebroadcasts KPHO-TV
 K29LN-D in Santa Rosa, New Mexico
 K29LO-D in Kingman, Arizona
 K29LQ-D in Polson, Montana
 K29LR-D in Baton Rouge, Louisiana
 K29LS-D in Calexico, California
 K29LV-D in Jackson, Minnesota
 K29LW-D in Rockaway Beach, Oregon
 K29LX-D in Hanksville, Utah
 K29LY-D in Salmon, Idaho
 K29LZ-D in Fountain Green, Utah
 K29MA-D in Boulder, Utah
 K29MC-D in Heber City, Utah, on virtual channel 13, which rebroadcasts KSTU
 K29MD-D in O'Neill, Nebraska
 K29ME-D in Antonito, Colorado
 K29MF-D in Peoa and Oakley, Utah
 K29MG-D in Hawthorne, Nevada
 K29MI-D in Parowan, Enoch, etc., Utah
 K29MJ-D in Rockville, Utah
 K29MK-D in Deming, New Mexico
 K29ML-D in Kanarraville/New Harmony, Utah
 K29MN-D in Fillmore, etc., Utah
 K29MP-D in Garrison, Utah
 K29MR-D in Emery, Utah
 K29MS-D in Green River, Utah
 K29MT-D in Scofield, Utah
 K29MV-D in Spring Glen, Utah
 K29MW-D in Duchesne, Utah, on virtual channel 14, which rebroadcasts KJZZ-TV
 K29MX-D in Manila, etc, Utah
 K29MY-D in Randolph, Utah
 K29MZ-D in Clarendon, Texas
 K29NB-D in Cascade, Idaho
 K29NC-D in Monroe, Louisiana
 K29ND-D in Hot Springs, Montana
 K29NF-D in Anton, Colorado, on virtual channel 7, which rebroadcasts KMGH-TV
 K29NG-D in Crested Butte, Colorado
 K29NH-D in Lund & Preston, Nevada
 K29NI-D in Cave Junction, Oregon
 K29NK-D in Eureka, Nevada
 K29NL-D in Wichita, Kansas
 K29NM-D in Spokane, Washington
 K29NN-D in Lucerne Valley, California, on virtual channel 2
 K29NO-D in The Dalles, Oregon, on virtual channel 12, which rebroadcasts KPTV
 K29NW-D in Midland, Texas
 K29NX-D in Alexandria, Louisiana
 K29NY-D in Alexandria, Minnesota
 K29OC-D in Chapman, Kansas
 K29OE-D in Racine, Minnesota
 K29OF-D in Deadwood, South Dakota
 K29OH-D in Victoria, Texas
 K44JU-D in Antimony, Utah
 K46HL-D in Susanville, etc., California
 K48GQ-D in Redwood Falls, Minnesota, on virtual channel 29
 KBFX-CD in Bakersfield, California
 KBJE-LD in Tyler, Texas
 KBWF-LD in Sioux City, Iowa
 KCYU-LD in Yakima, Washington
 KDBZ-CD in Bozeman, Montana
 KDEN-TV in Longmont, Colorado, on virtual channel 25
 KDKF in Klamath Falls, Oregon
 KDTN in Denton, Texas, on virtual channel 29
 KECA-LD in Eureka, California
 KEHO-LD in Houston, Texas, on virtual channel 32
 KENS in San Antonio, Texas
 KEPB-TV in Eugene, Oregon
 KFTR-DT in Ontario, California, on virtual channel 46
 KFXL-LD in Lufkin, Texas
 KGAN in Cedar Rapids, Iowa
 KHDS-LD in Salina, Kansas
 KHPX-CD in Georgetown, Texas
 KITU-TV in Beaumont, Texas
 KIWB-LD in Boise, Idaho
 KJLN-LD in Joplin, Missouri
 KJYY-LD in Portland, Oregon
 KKAI in Kailua, Hawaii
 KMBC-TV in Kansas City, Missouri, on virtual channel 9
 KMSG-LD in Fresno, California
 KNKC-LD in Lubbock, Texas
 KOPB-TV (DRT) in Newberg, Oregon, on virtual channel 10
 KPCE-LD in Tucson, Arizona
 KPIX-TV in San Francisco, California, on virtual channel 5
 KPLO-TV in Pierre, South Dakota
 KPSE-LD in Palm Springs, California
 KPTD-LP in Paris, Texas, uses KDTN's spectrum, on virtual channel 51
 KQMM-CD in Santa Maria, California
 KRBC-TV in Abilene, Texas
 KRCG in Jefferson City, Missouri
 KSAS-LP in Dodge City, Kansas
 KSFZ-LD in Springfield, Missouri
 KSTF in Scottsbluff, Nebraska
 KTAZ in Phoenix, Arizona, on virtual channel 39
 KTLO-LD in Colorado Springs, Colorado
 KTUZ-TV in Shawnee, Oklahoma
 KTZT-CD in Tulsa, Oklahoma
 KUHM-TV in Helena, Montana
 KUPT in Hobbs, New Mexico
 KUPX-TV in Provo, Utah, on virtual channel 16
 KVCW in Las Vegas, Nevada, and ATSC 3.0 station
 KWBQ in Santa Fe, New Mexico
 KWMO-LD in Hot Springs, Arkansas
 KWNB-LD in McCook, Nebraska
 KWOG in Springdale, Arkansas
 KXVO in Omaha, Nebraska
 KYLE-TV in Bryan, Texas
 W29CI-D in Salem, Illinois, on virtual channel 29
 W29CW-D in Duck Key, Florida
 W29DE-D in Hayesville, North Carolina
 W29DH-D in Moorefield, West Virginia
 W29DM-D in Lewisburg, Tennessee, on virtual channel 29
 W29DN-D in Athens, Georgia, on virtual channel 29
 W29DP-D in Welch, West Virginia
 W29EE-D in San Lorenzo, Puerto Rico, on virtual channel 5, which rebroadcasts WORA-TV
 W29EJ-D in Parkersburg, West Virginia
 W29EN-D in Soperton, Georgia
 W29ES-D in Jacksonville, Illinois
 W29ET-D in Coloma, Wisconsin
 W29EU-D in Clarks Summit, etc., Pennsylvania
 W29EV-D in Hackettstown, New Jersey, on virtual channel 58, which rebroadcasts WNJB
 W29EW-D in Willsboro, New York
 W29EY-D in Columbia, Mississippi
 W29EZ-D in Elmira, New York
 W29FD-D in Columbus, Georgia
 W29FE-D in Bat Cave, etc., North Carolina
 W29FF-D in Atlantic City, New Jersey, on virtual channel 45
 W29FJ-D in Dothan, Alabama
 W29FK-D in Clarksburg, West Virginia
 W29FQ-D in Pottsville, Pennsylvania
 W29FR-D in Lebanon-Nashville, Tennessee, on virtual channel 29
 WAMS-LD in Minster-New Bremen, Ohio
 WAUR-LD in Aurora, Illinois, on virtual channel 29
 WAZS-LD in North Charleston, South Carolina
 WBGT-CD in Rochester, New York
 WBRC in Birmingham, Alabama
 WCHS-TV in Charleston, West Virginia
 WCVW in Richmond, Virginia
 WCYB-TV in Bristol, Virginia
 WDJT-TV in Milwaukee, Wisconsin, on virtual channel 58
 WDOX-LD in Palm Beach, Florida
 WDZC-LD in Augusta, Georgia
 WELL-LD in Philadelphia, Pennsylvania, on virtual channel 45
 WFBD in Destin, Florida
 WFET-LD in Lewisburg, Tennessee
 WFTC in Minneapolis, Minnesota, on virtual channel 9
 WFYI-LD in Indianapolis, Indiana
 WGFL in High Springs, Florida
 WGTE-TV in Toledo, Ohio
 WGTU in Traverse City, Michigan
 WIIW-LD in Nashville, Tennessee, on virtual channel 14
 WJAC-TV in Bedford, Pennsylvania
 WJDO-LD in Macon, Georgia
 WJYL-CD in Jeffersonville, Indiana
 WKGB-TV in Bowling Green, Kentucky
 WKIZ-LD in Key West, Florida, on virtual channel 49
 WKNO in Memphis, Tennessee
 WKOP-TV in Knoxville, Tennessee
 WKTV in Utica, New York
 WLEH-LD in St. Louis, Illinois, on virtual channel 48
 WLNM-LD in Lansing, Michigan
 WLNY-TV in Riverhead, New York, on virtual channel 55
 WMDT in Salisbury, Maryland
 WMVJ-CD in Melbourne, Florida, on virtual channel 31, which rebroadcasts WTMO-CD
 WNCB-LD in Fayetteville, North Carolina, on virtual channel 16
 WNEO in Alliance, Ohio
 WNEU in Merrimack, New Hampshire, on virtual channel 60
 WNYD-LD in New York, New York
 WOMS-CD in Muskegon, Michigan
 WOOH-LD in Zanesville, Ohio, on virtual channel 29
 WORA-TV in Mayaguez, Puerto Rico, on virtual channel 5
 WPBT in Miami, Florida, on virtual channel 2
 WPTO in Oxford, Ohio, on virtual channel 14
 WPXU-LD in Amityville, New York
 WQMK-LD in Cusseta, Alabama
 WQMY in Williamsport, Pennsylvania
 WQXT-CD in St. Augustine, Florida
 WRJA-TV in Sumter, South Carolina
 WSBT-TV in South Bend, Indiana
 WSFX-TV in Wilmington, North Carolina
 WSQY-LD in Spartanburg, South Carolina
 WSWF-LD in Orlando, Florida, on virtual channel 10
 WTCI in Chattanooga, Tennessee
 WTXX-LD in New Haven, Connecticut
 WUHQ-LD in Grand Rapids, Michigan
 WUND-TV in Edenton, North Carolina
 WUNJ-TV in Wilmington, North Carolina
 WURH-CD in Miami, Florida, uses WPBT's spectrum, on virtual channel 13
 WVTN-LD in Corbin, Kentucky
 WVUE-DT in New Orleans, Louisiana
 WWAT-CD in Charleroi, Pennsylvania, on virtual channel 45, which rebroadcasts WPTG-CD
 WWPB in Hagerstown, Maryland, on virtual channel 31
 WXEL-TV in Boynton Beach, Florida, uses WPBT's spectrum, on virtual channel 42
 WXLV-TV in Winston-Salem, North Carolina
 WXON-LD in Flint, Michigan
 WXPX-TV in Bradenton, Florida, on virtual channel 66
 WYGA-CD in Atlanta, Georgia, on virtual channel 16

The following stations, which are no longer licensed, formerly broadcast on digital channel 29 in the United States:
 K29AA-D in Kalispell/Whitefish, Montana
 K29BH-D in Wellington, Texas
 K29BR-D in Canadian, Texas
 K29JB-D in Moses Lake, Washington
 K29JD-D in Redding, California
 K29JF-D in Rolla, Missouri
 K29JW-D in Granite Falls, Minnesota
 K29KH-D in Kasilof, Alaska
 K29MM-D in Billings, Montana
 K29MU-D in Coos Bay, Oregon
 KBKV-LD in Columbia, Missouri
 W29DT-D in Tuscaloosa, Alabama
 WAOH-CD in Akron, Ohio
 WBOA-CD in Kittanning, Pennsylvania
 WEHG-LD in Wausau, Wisconsin
 WEYS-LD in Miami, Florida
 WNYJ-TV in West Milford, New Jersey

References

29 digital